The 2006 United States motorcycle Grand Prix was the eleventh race of the 2006 Motorcycle Grand Prix season. It took place on the weekend of July 21–23, 2006 at the Laguna Seca circuit.

MotoGP classification

Championship standings after the race (MotoGP)

Below are the standings for the top five riders and constructors after round eleven has concluded.

Drivers' Championship standings

Constructors' Championship standings

References

United States motorcycle Grand Prix
United States
United States Motorcycle Grand Prix
United States Motorcycle Grand Prix